Guru is the soundtrack to the 2007 film directed by Mani Ratnam. The soundtrack was released on 18 November 2006. Gurus music is composed by A. R. Rahman with lyrics provided by Gulzar.

Overview
Like many of Rahman's soundtracks, Guru comes with a variety of songs. The songs vary in their musical style, from the  Turkish inspired "Mayya Mayya" to the  folk-ish "Ek Lo Ek Muft", the love ballad Tere Bina and rain-themed song, "Barso Re".

The song Tere Bina is dedicated to the memory of Pakistani qawwali singer Ustad Nusrat Fateh Ali Khan since it was the 10th anniversary of his death. Gulzar also adapted the lyrics of "Ay Hairathe" from the lyrics of Amir Khushroo's "Ay Sarbathe Aashiqui". Rahman personally trained Egyptian singer Maryem Tollar to sing "M
Mayya", a song which Rahman wrote while on Hajj in Makkah. After he heard a man near a river who was continually repeating "maya maya maya" (water in Arabic), he told Gulzar to incorporate the word into the tune he had created while touring in Toronto, Ontario, Canada.

The soundtrack has proved a success, staying at the number one spot thirteen weeks after its release, despite receiving stiff competition from other albums released.

The song "Shauk Hai" has been used in the movie, but was not released on the audio CD.

The soundtrack release of Guru also incorporated bonus tracks from Rahman's other albums Rang De Basanti, Lagaan, Kisna, Zubeidaa and Meenaxi.

Usage in media
The song "Tere Bina" was used in the 2013 American 3D computer-animated adventure sports comedy film Planes, produced by DisneyToon Studios and released by Walt Disney Pictures.

The song "Tere Bina" was used in American web series Ms. Marvel based on character of the same name in American comic book Marvel comics . Produced by Marvel studio. It was used in season 1 episode 3 "destined" it was released in 22 June 2022 .

Track listing

Hindi (Original)
Lyrics:Gulzar

Tamil (Dubbed)
Lyrics: Vairamuthu

Telugu (Dubbed)
Lyrics : Veturi

Awards
Filmfare Awards
Won, Best Music Direction – A. R. Rahman
Won, Best Female Playback – Shreya Ghoshal for Barso Re
Nominated, Best Male Playback – A. R. Rahman for Tere Bina
Nominated, Best Lyrics – Gulzar
Star Screen Awards
Won, Best Music Direction – A. R. Rahman
Won, Best Background Score – A. R. Rahman
Won, Best Female Playback – Shreya Ghoshal for Barso Re
Nominated, Best Female Playback – Chinmayi for Tere Bina
IIFA Awards
Won, Best Music Direction – A. R. Rahman
Won, Best Female Playback – Shreya Ghoshal for Barso Re
Nominated, Best Lyrics – Gulzar

Zee Cine Awards
Won, Best Music Direction – A. R. Rahman
Won, Best Female Playback – Shreya Ghoshal for Barso Re
Nominated, Best Lyrics – Gulzar

References

A. R. Rahman soundtracks
Hindi film soundtracks
2006 soundtrack albums
Sony Music India soundtracks
2000s film soundtrack albums